Eddie Timanus (born 1968) is a USA Today sportswriter and game show contestant who grew up in Reston, Virginia, then graduated from Wake Forest University.  Timanus has been blind since he was a toddler due to retinoblastoma. He is best known for his five-game winning streak on the game show Jeopardy! and for being the first blind contestant to appear on the show.

Early life
Timanus was born on August 9, 1968, in St. Joseph, Missouri. At age three, Timanus had an operation to remove tumors from his eyes, leading to his blindness.  Following his Jeopardy! success, Timanus related a story from his childhood that his mother told him: "I came home and said, 'Turn on the lights.' And she said, 'They're on and you won't see them.' And I said, 'Well, OK' and went on."

Timanus' father, Chuck, was a play-by-play announcer.  Eddie began attending sporting events with his father at the age of six, and he started keeping statistics at the age of eleven.  Timanus graduated from Wake Forest University in 1990 with a degree in economics.  In 1991, The Washington Post reported that Eddie worked alongside Chuck as a statkeeper for American University's basketball games, using pegboards and abaci, compiling statistical information for WINX-AM radio. His mother, Terri Timanus, was also a Jeopardy! contestant, appearing in 1991 and losing her only game.

Jeopardy!
Timanus was a contestant on Jeopardy!; his games aired in October 1999. He was the first blind contestant to compete on the show. There were a few changes made to accommodate Timanus: the first was that he received a card with the category names printed in Braille before each round, and a Braille keyboard to type out his name on the podium's computer and his response and wager for Final Jeopardy!. There were also no video-based clues during his appearances. Also, beginning with his appearances, contestants started out the show already at their podiums, instead of the old practice of walking up to them as they were being introduced. (The practice became permanent starting in September 2000.) Timanus refused further accommodations.

Timanus won five consecutive games and then, in accordance with the rules in effect at that time, retired undefeated. His winnings totaled US$69,700 plus two new cars (Chevrolet Camaros in his case), and he was invited back for the 2000 Tournament of Champions in Atlanta, Georgia, where he reached the semifinals and won $5,000 there. The story became a minor media sensation, with Jeopardy! Nielsen ratings rising 15 percent for Timanus's fourth and fifth games. Host Alex Trebek received one of six Access Awards from the American Foundation for the Blind in 2001 for his role in accommodating Timanus.

Timanus was a contestant on the Jeopardy! Million Dollar Masters Tournament in New York City which aired in May 2002, but did not advance beyond the first round and took home $10,000.

Timanus also appeared in the Jeopardy! Ultimate Tournament of Champions on March 16, 2005, in a first-round game. He finished in second place, taking home $5,000. In addition to the Braille cards and computer keyboard provided on his earlier appearances, an audible tone that was in sync with the game board's lights was added in order to give him an indication of when he could begin buzzing in to respond.

Timanus participated in the March 3, 2014 episode of the Jeopardy! Battle of the Decades tournament. While he had the most money going into Final Jeopardy! round in which every contestant answered incorrectly, he lost by a margin of $200 finishing in second place behind Rachael Schwartz. As with his Ultimate Tournament of Champions appearance, he was given Braille cards, a computer keyboard, and an audible buzz-in indicator.

Who Wants to Be a Millionaire
In 2000 he acted as a lifeline on Who Wants to Be a Millionaire. On November 26, 2004, Timanus appeared again on Millionaire, this time as a contestant, and won $50,000 in prize money. When he used the phone-a-friend lifeline, host Meredith Vieira would read the question and the four choices to the friend that he chose to call and would also remind him how much time was remaining on the 30 seconds used for that lifeline.

Sportswriting
Timanus is a staff sportswriter for USA Today. His articles appear frequently in the publication.  In addition to general reporting, he is responsible for compiling the weekly USA Today Coaches' Poll.  He also writes the preview section for college football games.

Personal life
He met his wife through a Yahoo! Groups discussion group on game shows; the couple now has a son.

References

External links
USA Today college polls
USA Today football digest
Article on Timanus from Wake Forest University paper Old Gold & Black
Timanus's player profile on the J! Archive

1968 births
Living people
People from St. Joseph, Missouri
Jeopardy! contestants
American blind people
Wake Forest University alumni
People from Reston, Virginia
USA Today journalists
American male journalists
American sportswriters
Journalists from Missouri
Journalists from Virginia